Wrose is a village and civil parish in the City of Bradford metropolitan borough of West Yorkshire, England, about three miles north of Bradford city centre, and southeast of Shipley.
The civil parish population taken at the 2011 Census was 7,518.

History 

Although the name Wrose was established as a place name within the Manor of Idle by the time of Elizabeth I of England, it is not mentioned in the Poll Tax returns of 1379.
The name probably existed as a place name for some time before then.

Rapid house expansion took place in Wrose in the 1930s.
Many houses dating from the time of Charles II were demolished to make way for these new semi-detached properties.

Close to the old quarries to the north west of Wrose was the former Wrose Hill brickworks created for the manufacture of bricks and sanitary tubes.

Geography 

Wrose is surrounded by other areas of Shipley and Bradford such as Windhill, Woodend, West Royd, Idle Moor, Gaisby and Owlet.

Around the hillside (Carr Hill) can be found the remains of many stone quarries, whose growth exploded in the 19th century as the city of Bradford grew with the wool trade.
Many of Bradford's fine Yorkshire millstone buildings are built from these resources.
A quarry at nearby Bolton Woods still operates today.
The geology of the area is that of mudstones, siltstones, fine sandstones, coal, pipeclay, fireclay and ganister as indicated by exposed rocks in the old quarry—parts of which are in a dangerous state.

Governance 

Wrose has been civil parish since 2004.
The area is entirely surrounded by unparished areas of Bradford.

Landmarks 

Churches in Wrose include St Cuthbert's Church, Bolton Villas Church and Wrose Methodist Church
while the local post office and local branch library are on Wrose Road.
Also on Wrose Road are Wrose's two public houses, The Bold Privateer and Wrose Bull.
The Bold Privateer is named after the Earl of Cumberland who owned all the land in the Wrose area in the time of Elizabeth I of England.
The present-day Wrose Bull was originally named The Hare and Hounds after its move to new premises, but at the insistence of locals was renamed for the colloquial name of the original alehouse.
There are listed buildings in Wrose on Snowden Road
and Tudor Barn Court.

Economy 

Wrose is a largely residential area and there are a number of shops along Wrose Road in Wrose.

Education 

Low Ash Primary School is to be found on Wrose Road close to the centre of Wrose.

Transport 

Wrose is served by a number of West Yorkshire Transport's bus services.

Notable residents 

Wrose was home to the Yorkshire sporting family the Jowets, of which the last and most notable member was Dawson Jowet, founder of the Airedale beagles hunting pack in 1891, and its Master until his death in 1933.
His monument remains on Ilkley Moor.
Adrian Edmondson comic actor, writer, musician and director, was born in Wrose but grew up in nearby Idle.
The Yorkshire & Humber MEP Richard Corbett, Leader of the Labour MEPs, lives in Wrose.

See also 

 Listed buildings in Windhill and Wrose

References

External links 

 Wrose Parish Council.

Areas of Bradford
Villages in West Yorkshire
Civil parishes in West Yorkshire